Pope Francis visited  Kenya from 25 to 27 November 2015. It was his first state and pastoral visit to the country and the continent of Africa at large. Francis is the second pontiff to visit Kenya after John Paul II who visited Kenya 3 times. In his visit, he met the president of the Republic of Kenya, Uhuru Kenyatta, held meetings with various members of the clergy, held an open mass at the University of Nairobi and visited a poor slum neighbourhood of Kangemi. As a result of his visit, most of the roads in Nairobi were closed on Thursday and parts of Friday

Schedule
The Pope's 3 day schedule as published on the Vatican website at w2.vatican.va

Wednesday, 25 November 2015
The Pope arrived at JKIA at 1335 GMT.

Thursday, 26 November 2015
Thursday was declared a public holiday by the President Uhuru Kenyatta

Friday, 27 November 2015

Security
A total of 10,000 police officers were deployed to secure the Pope's visit.

Closed roads
In a televised press release, Inspector General of Police, Joseph Boinnet  informed the public about road closures during the visit.

References

2015 in Christianity
2015 in Kenya
Holy See–Kenya relations
Francis, Kenya
November 2015 events in Africa
Visit to Kenya